Baris is a town in Egypt. It contains the ancient Egyptian temple of Dosh.

It is south of the New Valley Governorate,  from the Kharga Oasis.

References 

Populated places in New Valley Governorate
Oases of Egypt